Joseph Somers (29 May 1917 – 25 May 1966) was a Belgian professional road cyclist. Professional from 1936 to 1950, he notably won Bordeaux–Paris in 1937 and 1947, the Grand Prix des Nations in 1943 and the Tour of Belgium in 1939.

Major results

1935
 2nd Schaal Sels
1936
 1st Stage 5 Tour de l'Ouest
 2nd Gent–Wevelgem
1937
 1st Bordeaux–Paris
 1st Stage 4 (ITT) Tour of Belgium
 3rd Paris–Rennes
 9th Liège–Bastogne–Liège
1938
 1st Stage 4a (ITT) Tour of Belgium
1939
 1st  Overall Tour of Belgium
1st Stages 4a (ITT), 4b & 5
 1st Stages 6 & 7 Tour de Suisse
 1st Stage 1 Tour de Luxembourg
 6th Liège–Bastogne–Liège
1941
 1st De Drie Zustersteden
 9th Tour of Flanders
1942
 3rd National Cyclo-cross Championships
1943
 1st Grand Prix des Nations
 1st Grand Prix de Momignies
 1st GP de Belgique
 2nd Critérium des As
 3rd National Cyclo-cross Championships
 6th Liège–Bastogne–Liège
1944
 1st Grand Prix de Wallonie
1945
 5th Overall Tour of Belgium
 5th A Travers Lausanne
1946
 2nd Bordeaux–Paris
 4th Liège–Bastogne–Liège
 10th La Flèche Wallonne
1947
 1st Bordeaux–Paris
1950
 3rd Bordeaux–Paris

References

External links
 

1917 births
1966 deaths
Belgian male cyclists
Tour de Suisse stage winners